The crown for the Queen consort of Norway was made in 1830 for Désirée Clary's coronation. It did not take place, and was first used in 1860, for the coronation of Louise of the Netherlands.

It was made in Stockholm and, though it is unknown by whom, probably by Marc Giron, the royal jeweller, some have speculated it may have been by Erik Lundberg, or, perhaps is a combination of both's work, and the design is probably based on the Swedish queen's crown.

It is made of silver-gilt and gold, and is decorated with a number of multicoloured gems and pearls, including violet (Amethysts), yellow (Citrine and Topaz) and green (chrysoprase). It weighs approx 530g.

See also 
 Regalia of Norway

References
Official Site - The crown info

Crown jewels
Individual crowns
State ritual and ceremonies
Norwegian monarchy
Silver-gilt objects
1830 establishments in Norway

de:Krone der norwegischen Königin